Haunted is a paranormal pseudo-documentary developed by Propagate. The anthology series focuses on horror stories in which individuals or groups of people talk about their paranormal experience. The six-episode first season premiered on Netflix on October 19, 2018. Season 2 was released on Netflix on October 11, 2019. Season 3 was released on Netflix on May 14, 2021.

Many of the stories featured in the series resemble popular horror films released prior to the alleged date on which the events occurred. Others contain very little to no corroborating evidence to back up the stories. In the first episode, the story teller describes being revived by a defibrillator after having been medically dead from dehydration and heat stroke. Episode 2, "The Slaughterhouse", features a woman recounting the story of her serial killer parents. However, despite many people searching for any reference, police report, or news story relating to these events, no evidence was found to support it, leading many to question the show's "true story" claims. It has a 2020 spin-off- Haunted: Latin America.

Episodes

Season 1 (2018)

Season 2 (2019)

Season 3 (2021)

References

External links 
  on Netflix
 

2010s American horror television series
2010s American documentary television series
2018 American television series debuts
English-language Netflix original programming
Czech documentary television series
Czech horror fiction television series